Melanophilin is a carrier protein which in humans is encoded by the MLPH gene. Several alternatively spliced transcript variants of this gene have been described, but the full-length nature of some of these variants has not been determined.

Function 

This gene encodes a member of the exophilin subfamily of Rab effector proteins. The protein forms a ternary complex with the small Ras-related GTPase Rab27A in its GTP-bound form and the motor protein myosin Va. A similar protein complex in mouse functions to tether pigment-producing organelles called melanosomes to the actin cytoskeleton in melanocytes, and is required for visible pigmentation in the hair and skin.

In melanocytic cells MLPH gene expression may be regulated by MITF.

Clinical significance 

A mutation in this gene results in Griscelli syndrome type 3, which is characterized by a silver-gray hair color and abnormal pigment distribution in the hair shaft.

Mutations in melanophilin cause the "dilute" coat color phenotype in dogs and cats. Variation in this gene appears to have been a target for recent natural selection in humans, and it has been hypothesized that this is due to a role in human pigmentation.

References

Further reading

External links 
 

Human proteins